The Ritz-Carlton Half Moon Bay is a luxury hotel and golf resort in Half Moon Bay northern California. The hotel is a Forbes Five Star hotel, and was featured on the travel channel series Great Hotels. The hotel has 261 rooms, that in 2019, started at US$920 a night. The hotel began construction in 1998, and finished in 2001. 

The hotel is the biggest employer for the town of Half Moon Bay, California, with approximately 550 jobs. The hotel was purchased by Anbang Insurance Group in 2015, and after its bankruptcy has had repeated offers from other buyers, but as of September 2021 there were no buyers.

The hotel sits on a point in the bay, that allows for views along a long section of the coast; some reviews claim . Parts of the hotel services are themed around the Scottish Highlands. One of the two golf courses was designed by Arnold Palmer. The hotel services also include a  spa and three tennis courts.

Issues 

The hotel contributes most of the tourism income for the local Half Moon Bay, California government, including both transient resident and property taxes. A 2022 study published by the local government also found that the hotel and its infrastructure were vulnerable to sea level rise. A February 2017 storm eroded significant sections of the bluff, which the builders had previously intended to be included in the building.

In 2019, the hotel was fined 1.6 million dollars by the California Coastal Commission for impeding beach access for non-guests. Some of the money from the fine was given to local conservation group Peninsula Open Space Trust.

Legend of the Motorcycle

The Legend of the Motorcycle International Concours d’Elegance was an international motorcycle exhibition held at the hotel, for 3 years from 2006-2008. It was the first motorcycle Concours d'Dlegance held in the United States with a team of judges and exhibited motorcycles brought in from around the world, and was notable for several first-ever or largest-ever displays of Brough Superiors, Crockers, Excelsior-Hendersons, etc. The event was organized by husband and wife team  Jared Zaugg and Brooke Roner of San Francisco, with major corporate sponsorship by Kiehls and Men's Vogue.

The three-day-event included art and ephemera exhibitions inside the Ritz-Carlton hotel itself, a Friday evening reception dinner, the Saturday Concours d'Elegance and prize-giving ceremony, and a Sunday 'Legends Ride', a 44-mile (72 km) scenic loop over the mountain ridge-top that overlooks the Pacific Ocean and included Highway 1 and Skyline Boulevard. The inclusion of a ride with the Concours d'Elegance reinforced the requirement that any motorcycle winning an award at the LOTM Concours must be in running condition (with specific exceptions, such as Land Speed Racers and Grand Prix racers); motorcycles that could not be started and ridden over the awards podium forfeited their prize.

This atypical concours d’elegance was established to create a competitive event for motorcycles that previously had been associated with fine automobiles. The Concours exhibited up to two hundred motorcycles on the lawn of the Ritz-Carlton golf course, and represented motorcycle history from its origins in 1869 (with a replica of Sylvester Roper's steamer present), to the present, with factory prototypes and custom motorcycles. Each year a different motorcycle factory was specially featured, including Vincent, Excelsior-Henderson, and Crocker.

Custom motorcycles were included for the first time in a major Concours d'Elegance, recognizing the impact of these hand-made works of art on the motorcycle industry as a whole. The builders featured included the Japanese master Shinya Kimura, and the noted bike builder, stuntman, and innovator, Indian Larry, and TV celebrity motorcycle customizer Jesse James, founder of the West Coast Choppers, who showed his Radial Hell aero bike, which is powered by a 7-cylinder Rotec radial aircraft engine. West Coast Choppers unveiled their Airstream Bike at the Legend show, which cost over $300,000 and was made for Airstream CEO, Bob Wheeler. Ian Barry at Falcon Motorcycles also unveiled The Bullet Falcon, at the 2008 concours. It was custom-created for the skateboarder and actor Jason Lee, and won "Best Custom" at the show.

On average, 6,000 visitors attended the event, including iconic motorcycle riders such as Peter Fonda, the son of Steve McQueen, Chad McQueen, Ewan McGregor, and the famed stuntman and racer, Bud Ekins.

In popular culture 
The hotel was a filming location for the 2003 movie American Wedding.

References 

Hotels in California
Luxury hotels